Copper Kettle Canyon is a valley in the U.S. state of Nevada.

Copper Kettle Canyon was named for deposits of copper which were mined beginning in 1908.

References

Valleys of Churchill County, Nevada